Naďa Konvalinková (Naděžda Konvalinková; born 18 April 1951 in Prague, Czechoslovakia) is a Czech actress.

After graduating from the Faculty of Theatre of the Academy of Performing Arts in Prague, she worked in the J. K. Tyl Theatre, Plzeň, later in the Prague City Theatre (:cs:Městská divadla pražská).

Of her numerous film roles, one of the best known one is that of a carnivorous plant from the 1977 black comedy Dinner for Adele.

During 1980–2005 she was married to actor Oldřich Kaiser, with whom she had daughter Karolina in 1983. (Karolina is a stage actress as well.)

In her later years her struggle with weight attracted media attention, and in 2011 she was the host of the TV show Jste to, co jíte ("You are what You Eat" (the Czech title is a pun, akin to "it/eat"). Before that for 7 years she was a co-host of the TV show about food, Pochoutky ("Delicacies").

Filmography
 2006 - I Served the King of England
 1997 - Lotrando a Zubejda
 1993 - Nesmrtelná teta
 1983 - Srdečný pozdrav ze zeměkoule
 1977 - Dinner for Adele
 1976 - Honza málem králem

References

1951 births
Living people
Czech film actresses
Czech stage actresses
Czech television actresses
Actresses from Prague
Academy of Performing Arts in Prague alumni
Czech voice actresses